Emmanuel Wangwe is a Kenyan politician who is currently a member of the Kenya National Assembly where he serves as majority whip.

He represents the Navakholo Constituency and is a member of the Jubilee Party

Election Results

References

Living people
21st-century Kenyan politicians
Year of birth missing (living people)
Members of the 12th Parliament of Kenya
Members of the 13th Parliament of Kenya
Jubilee Party politicians